Pavla is the Czech form of the given name Paula. Pavla may refer to:

Pavla Brantalova (born 1977), female bodybuilder born in the Czech Republic
Pavla Chrástová (born 1979), retired female medley swimmer from the Czech Republic
Pavla Hamáčková-Rybová (born 1978), Czech athlete and Olympic pole vaulter
Pavla Havlíková (born 1983), Czech professional racing cyclist
Pavla Topolánková (born 1955), Czech politician
Pavla Vykopalová (born 1972), Czech opera singer

Feminine given names
Czech feminine given names
Slovene feminine given names